Schönbrunn Palace was the main summer residence of the Habsburg rulers, located in Hietzing, Vienna. The name Schönbrunn (meaning "beautiful spring") has its roots in an artesian well from which water was consumed by the court.

The 1,441-room Rococo palace is one of the most important architectural, cultural, and historic monuments in the country. The history of the palace and its vast gardens spans over 300 years, reflecting the changing tastes, interests, and aspirations of successive Habsburg monarchs. It has been a major tourist attraction since the mid-1950s.

History

In 1569, Holy Roman Emperor Maximilian II purchased a large floodplain of the Wien river beneath a hill, situated between Meidling and Hietzing. The former owner, in 1548, had erected a mansion called Katterburg. The emperor ordered the area to be fenced and put game  there such as pheasants, ducks, deer and boar, in order for it to serve as the court's recreational hunting ground. In a small separate part of the area, "exotic" birds such as turkeys and peafowl were kept. Fishponds were also built.

During the next century, the area was used as a hunting and recreation ground. Eleonora Gonzaga, who loved hunting, spent much time there and was bequeathed the area as her widow's residence after the death of her husband, Ferdinand II. From 1638 to 1643, she added a palace to the Katterburg mansion, while in 1642 came the first mention of the name “Schönbrunn” on an invoice. The origins of the Schönbrunn orangery seem to go back to Eleonora Gonzaga as well. The Schönbrunn Palace in its present form was built and remodelled during the 1740–50s during the reign of empress Maria Theresa who received the estate as a wedding gift. Franz I commissioned the redecoration of the palace exterior in the neoclassical style as it appears today.

Franz Joseph, the longest-reigning emperor of Austria, was born at Schönbrunn and spent a great deal of his life there. He died there, at the age of 86, on 21 November 1916. Following the downfall of the Habsburg monarchy in November 1918, the palace became the property of the newly founded Austrian Republic and was preserved as a museum.

After World War II and during the Allied Occupation of Austria (1945—55), Schönbrunn Palace was requisitioned to provide office space for both the British Delegation to the Allied Commission for Austria, and for the headquarters for the small British Military Garrison present in Vienna. With the reestablishment of the Austrian republic in 1955, the palace once again became a museum. It is still sometimes used for important events such as the meeting between U.S. president John F. Kennedy and Soviet premier Nikita Khrushchev in 1961.

Since 1992, the palace and gardens have been owned and administered by the Schloss Schönbrunn Kultur-und Betriebsges.m.b.H., a limited-liability company wholly owned by the Republic of Austria. The company conducts preservation and restoration of all palace properties without state subsidies. UNESCO catalogued Schönbrunn Palace on the World Heritage List in 1996, together with its gardens, as a remarkable Baroque ensemble and example of synthesis of the arts (Gesamtkunstwerk).

Gardens 

The sculpted garden space between the palace and the Neptune Fountain is called the Great Parterre. The French garden, a big part of the area, was planned by Jean Trehet, a disciple of André Le Nôtre, in 1695. It contains, among other things, a maze.

The complex however includes many more attractions: besides the Tiergarten, an orangerie erected around 1755, staple luxuries of European palaces of its type, a palm house (replacing, by 1882, around ten earlier and smaller glass houses in the western part of the park) is noteworthy. Western parts were turned into English garden style in 1828–1852.

The area called Meidlinger Vertiefung (Engl.: depression of Meidling) to the west of the castle was turned into a play area and drill ground for the children of the Habsburgs in the 19th century. At this time it was common to use parks for the military education of young princes. Whereas the miniature bastion, which was built for this purpose, does not exist anymore, the garden pavilion that was used as shelter still does. It was turned into a café in 1927 and is known as Landtmann’s Jausen Station since 2013.

At the outmost western edge, a botanical garden going back to an earlier arboretum was re-arranged in 1828, when the Old Palm House was built. A modern enclosure for orangutans, was restored besides a restaurant and office rooms in 2009.

Sculptures 

The Great Parterre of Schönbrunn has 32 sculptures, which represent deities and virtues.

Gloriette 

The garden axis points towards a  hill, which since 1775 has been crowned by the Gloriette structure (Fischer von Erlach had initially planned to erect the main palace on the top of this hill).

Maria Theresa decided the Gloriette should be designed to glorify Habsburg power and the Just War (a war that would be carried out of “necessity” and lead to peace), and thereby ordered the builders to recycle “otherwise useless stone” which was left from the near-demolition of Schloss Neugebäude. The same material was also to be used for the Roman ruin.

The Gloriette was destroyed in the Second World War, but had already been restored by 1947, and was restored again in 1995.

The Gloriette today houses a café and an observation deck which provides panoramic views of the city.

Roman Ruins 

Originally known as the Ruin of Carthage, the Roman Ruin is a set of follies that was designed by the architect Johann Ferdinand Hetzendorf von Hohenberg, and erected as an entirely new architectural feature in 1778. Fully integrated into its parkland surroundings, this architectural ensemble should be understood as a picturesque horticultural feature and not simply as a ruin, which due to lack of maintenance it had increasingly grown to resemble prior to its recent restoration.

The fashion for picturesque ruins that became widespread with the rise of the Romantic movement soon after the middle of the 18th century symbolized both the decline of once great powers and the preservation of the remains of a heroic past. Erected at the same time not far from the Roman Ruin, the Obelisk Fountain was intended to complete the iconographic program of the park at Schönbrunn as a symbol of stability and permanence.

The Roman Ruin consists of a rectangular pool enclosed by a massive arch with lateral walls, evoking the impression of an ancient edifice slowly crumbling into the ground. In the pool in front of the ruin is a seemingly haphazard arrangement of stone fragments supporting a figural group which symbolizes the rivers Vltava and Elbe.

Activities at Schönbrunn today
Schönbrunn is Vienna's most popular tourist destination, which has been attended by 3,800,000 visitors in 2017. The whole Schönbrunn complex with Tiergarten Schönbrunn, Palmenhaus, Wüstenhaus, the Wagenburg, and the Schoenbrunn Palace Concerts accounted for more than five million visitors in 2009.
At the official website tickets can be purchased in advance for tours. In addition to tours and tour packages, many classical concerts featuring the music of Mozart and his contemporaries can be enjoyed with the added benefit of more time in the spectacular halls, Orangerie, or Schlosstheater.

The annual Summer Night Concert Schönbrunn is held on the grounds of Schönbrunn.

Schönbrunn Palace Concerts  

The Schönbrunn Palace Concerts are served by the Schönbrunn Palace Orchestra. Founded in 1997, it is led by the chief opera conductor Maestro Guido Mancusi since 1998. He also founded Chamber Opera Schönbrunn in the Schönbrunn Palace Concert series. 

In Vienna, they offer daily concerts at the original location of the world-famous contest between Mozart & Salieri (1786). They have a wealth of experience working with singers and ballet dancers. The Orchestra regularly tours around the world.

Film and television productions 

The gardens and palace have been the location for many films and television productions including such productions as the Sissi trilogy in the 1950s, A Breath of Scandal with Sophia Loren, and also briefly in the Bond movie The Living Daylights when Bond (Timothy Dalton) and Kara are riding through the palace garden; the palace is also seen during the end credits. The comedy The Great Race was filmed there in 1965. Jackie Chan shot scenes for Armour of God on the grounds. More recently, the television drama The Crown Prince starring Max von Thun as Crown Prince Rudolf and Klaus Maria Brandauer as Kaiser Franz-Josef was filmed there.

The Austrian television series, Kommissar Rex has shot several episodes there. In the Kuroshitsuji episode 2: His Butler, Omnipotent, Sebastian Michaelis tells his master that he was a guest at the Schönbrunn Palace soirees before his contract was sealed with Ciel as he teaches the young master how to dance. Dutch violinist André Rieu and the Johann Strauss Orchestra, along with the Opera Babes used it as the back drop for a version of the European Anthem, "Ode to Joy" in 2003.

In the third leg of The Amazing Race 4, the palace hosted a Fast Forward task where one team had to carry trays of champagne glasses across a ballroom floor of waltzing couples. In the sixth leg of The Amazing Race 23, teams had to race through the garden's maze and search for the Pit Stop located at the Gloriette.

The Disney animated TV show series Little Einsteins featured the Schönbrunn Palace during the Season 2 episode The Glass Slipper Ball, featuring the orange fish based on two clownfish, Marlin and Nemo from the 2003 Disney/Pixar animated film Finding Nemo and the painting by Andy Warhol and the music The Blue Danube Waltz by Johann Strauss II, based on the 1950 Disney animated fairy tale film, the title character and the book Cinderella by Charles Perrault which first aired in January 2007.

Gallery

The Schönbrunn Palace silver coin 
The palace was selected as the main motif of a high value commemorative coin: the Austrian 10-euro The Palace of Schönbrunn silver coin, minted on 8 October 2003. The obverse shows the central part of the frontage of the palace behind one of the great fountains in the open space.

See also
 Chinese Cabinets in Schönbrunn Palace
 Tiergarten Schönbrunn, the zoo in the palace gardens that claims to be the oldest one in the world
 Gloriette
 List of Baroque residences
 List of World Heritage Sites in Austria

References

External links 

Official Schönbrunn website 
Information about Schönbrunn 
Everycastle.com: Schönbrunn History and Pictures
Schönbrunn Gigapixel Panorama (12,000 Megapixel)
Wien.info: Schönbrunn Palace—”Empress Sisi's former summer residence”
Schönbrunn Palace: My Way of Telling History (PDF format)
Official Vienna city map: Schönbrunn—a far better aerial view, zoomable up to <1m resolution.*Click "Orthophoto" and "Draw new map", then zoom in [there seems to be no direct link].
Video of a street walk through the Schönbrunn Palace Gardens
Video about the Japanese Garden in the park of Schoenbrunn Palace 

 
Imperial residences in Austria
Museums in Vienna
Schonbrunn
Baroque architecture in Vienna
Buildings and structures in Hietzing
Gardens in Austria
Historic house museums in Austria
Landscape design history
Baroque gardens
Schonbrunn
Rococo architecture in Austria
Houses completed in 1548
1548 establishments in Austria
Houses completed in 1643
1643 establishments in Austria
Houses completed in 1750
World Heritage Sites in Vienna
Establishments in the Archduchy of Austria